Activ may refer to:

Activ (ship), SS Revoljucija 1909 
Activ (band)
Activ (car), 1.5L model of the Chevrolet Spin
Activ (company which supplies automotive components including ADAS)

See also
Activ Solar, Austrian solar company
Citizens Activ, album by Christian rapper Manafest 2008
Pilkington Activ, self-cleaning coated float glass product